2-Acetyl-1-pyrroline (2AP) is an aroma compound and flavor that gives freshly baked bread, jasmine rice and basmati rice, the spice pandan (Pandanus amaryllifolius), and bread flowers (Vallaris glabra) their customary smell. Many observers describe the smell as similar to "hot, buttered popcorn", and it is credited for lending this odor to the scent of binturong (bearcat) urine. Fresh marking fluid (MF) and urine of the tiger (Indian, Amur or Siberian) and Indian leopard also have a strong aroma due to 2AP.

2AP and its structural homolog, 6-acetyl-2,3,4,5-tetrahydropyridine of similar smell, can be formed by Maillard reactions during heating of food such as the baking of bread dough. Both compounds have odor thresholds below 0.06 ng/L.

Structure and properties 
2AP is a substituted pyrroline and a cyclic imine as well as a ketone.

References 

Flavors
Ketones
Imines
Pyrrolines